Carlos Otero (1916–1979) was a Portuguese film and television actor. He was married to the actress Isabel de Castro.

Selected filmography
 Criminal Brigade (1950)
 Under the Skies of the Asturias (1951)
 Persecution in Madrid (1952)
 Forbidden Trade (1952)
 The Dance of the Heart (1953)
 Spanish Fantasy (1953)
 The Dance of the Heart (1953)
 There's a Road on the Right (1953)

 Isola Bella (1961)
 Train d'enfer (1965) de Gilles Grangier
 The Man in Hiding (1971)
 My Horse, My Gun, Your Widow (1972)

References

Bibliography
 Goble, Alan. The Complete Index to Literary Sources in Film. Walter de Gruyter, 1999.

External links

1916 births
1979 deaths
Portuguese male film actors
Portuguese male television actors
People from Lisbon